A pamphlet  or chapbook is a small collection of poetry, usually 15 to 30 poems, centering around one theme. Poets often publish a pamphlet as their first work. Pamphlets are not usually more than 40 pages. They are sometimes handmade or saddle-stitched, a format best suited for small print runs. Compared to a full-length poetry collection, a pamphlet is fairly inexpensive to produce. Some poets design and print their own pamphlets. 

In the United States, a poetry pamphlet is called a chapbook. Since 2003, the Poetry Society of America offers an annual chapbook fellowship. Beginning in 2009 in Britain, the Poetry Book Society partnered with the British Library, to establish the Michael Marks Awards for Poetry Pamphlets.

See also
Pamphlet
Chapbook

References

 
Book formats
1820s neologisms